{{DISPLAYTITLE:C18H21N3O}}
The molecular formula C18H21N3O (molar mass: 295.379 g/mol) may refer to:

 Dibenzepin
 Dimethyllysergamide (DAM-57)
 LAE-32, or D-Lysergic acid ethylamide

Molecular formulas